Tunivisions is a Tunisian magazine attached to the press people.

History 
Tunivisions is a Tunisian monthly fashion and lifestyle magazine covering many topics including fashion, beauty, culture, living, and runway based in Tunisia, first published based in Tunis in 1997 by Jalel Jedy.

In 2006, it was republished by journalist Kaïs Ben Mrad, under the aegis of Réalités magazine.

In 2009, Nizar Chaari bought it and focused his editorial line on the Tunisian people.

The magazine is published on the first Saturday of the month and sold in newsstands at 3,500 dinars.

References

External links
 tunivisions.net

Celebrity magazines
Tunisian news websites
French-language magazines
Arabic-language magazines
French-language mass media in Tunisia
Arabic-language mass media in Tunisia
Magazines published in Tunisia
Magazines established in 1997
Mass media in Tunis